Steve Blackman is a Canadian television writer, and executive producer. He is the showrunner of The Umbrella Academy, a Netflix series based on the comic series by Gerard Way.  In 2016, Blackman won a Writers Guild of America Award for the second season of Fargo along with his fellow writers. In 2017, he was nominated for an Emmy for his work on Fargo along with other producers.

Early life and education
Blackman grew up in Edmonton, Canada. As a law student at the University of Alberta in 1996, he founded Law Show, an annual stage production written and performed by law students. As of 2018, it has raised over $300,000 for local charities. He also attended high school in Edmonton, Canada, at Ross Sheppard High School.

Career
Blackman passed the bar in 1998 and worked briefly as a divorce lawyer. Unhappy as an attorney, he teamed with Greg Ball, another newly-practicing lawyer, and together  they created The Associates, a drama series based on their experiences as recent law school graduates.  Ball and Blackman pitched and sold the series to CTV at the Banff Television Festival in 1999. When it aired, The Associates was the most expensive television series ever made in Canada. He produced 30 episodes of The Associates, which aired in 2001 and 2002.

In addition to his credits as a writer and producer on television shows, including Bones and Fargo, Blackman served as an executive producer and co-showrunner on Private Practice, Legion, and co-showrunner on Altered Carbon.

On November 9, 2017, Blackman was announced as an executive producer and show-runner of the Netflix series The Umbrella Academy.

Credits

References

External links

Canadian television writers
Canadian television producers
Showrunners
Year of birth missing (living people)
Living people
20th-century Canadian lawyers
University of Alberta Faculty of Law alumni
21st-century Canadian screenwriters